This article lists the squads for the 2010 AFC Women's Asian Cup, the 17th edition of the AFC Women's Asian Cup. The tournament is a quadrennial women's international football tournament for national teams in Asia organised by the Asian Football Confederation (AFC), and was held in China from 19 to 30 May 2010. In the tournament there were involved eight national teams. Each national team registered a final squad of 23 players.

The age listed for each player is on 19 May 2010, the first day of the tournament. The numbers of caps and goals listed for each player do not include any matches played after the start of tournament. The club listed is the club for which the player last played a competitive match prior to the tournament. The nationality for each club reflects the national association (not the league) to which the club is affiliated. A flag is included for coaches that are of a different nationality than their own national team.

Group A

Japan
Coach: Norio Sasaki

The squad was announced on 16 May 2010.

Myanmar
Coach: U Aye Kyu

North Korea
Coach: Kim Kwang-min

Thailand
Coach: Jatuporn Pramolbal

The squad was announced on 5 May 2010.

Group B

Australia
Coach:  Tom Sermanni

The squad was announced on 15 May 2010.

China
Coach: Shang Ruihua

The squad was announced on 4 May 2010.

South Korea
Coach: Lee Sang-yup

The squad was announced on 18 May 2010.

Vietnam
Coach: Vũ Bá Đông

The squad was announced on 13 April 2010.

Player representation
Statistics are per the beginning of the competition.

By representatives of domestic league

References

squads
2010